Exoneura is a genus of bees belonging to the family Apidae.

The species of this genus are found in Australia.

Species

Species:

Exoneura abstrusa 
Exoneura albolineata 
Exoneura albopilosa 
 ''Exoneura robusta

References

Apidae